Callidula oceanitis is a moth in the  family Callidulidae. It is found on the Schouten Islands.

The length of the forewings is about 16 mm. The ground colour of the forewings is black-brown with a large rounded golden-yellow patch. The hindwings are also black-brown with a golden-yellow patch.

References

Callidulidae
Moths described in 1916